Club Deportivo Tulancingo is a Mexican professional football team based in Tulancingo, Hidalgo that will play in the Liga Premier de México starting in the 2022–23 season.

History
Football has been a popular sport in Tulancingo, highlighting the FC Satélites and Titanes de Tulancingo clubs, the latter team winning the Serie A de México twice. However, no team has been able to establish itself for a long time in the city.

In May 2022, the C.D. Tulancingo to try to recover sports representation in the city. It was announced that they would seek to establish two teams, one in the Liga Premier de México and the other in the Liga TDP.

The team was accepted into the Liga Premier on July 1, 2022, its integration into Group 2 of Serie A was announced on July 12.

Players

First-team squad

Reserve teams
C.D. Tulancingo (Liga TDP)
Reserve team that plays in the Liga TDP, the fourth level of the Mexican league system.

References

Football clubs in Hidalgo (state)
Association football clubs established in 2022
2022 establishments in Mexico